Andre Agassi was the defending champion, but Pete Sampras defeated him 7–6(8–6), 6–7(6–8), 6–3, in the final.

Players

Draw

Main draw

Play-offs

External links
Official Commonwealth Bank International website
2002 Commonwealth Bank International results

Kooyong Classic
Com